A Night with My Ex is an American reality television series that premiered on July 18, 2017, on Bravo. Announced in April, the ten-part show features ex-couples that reunite for one night to discuss their relationship and "hash out their unresolved issues".

Episodes

References

External links 
 
 

2010s American reality television series
2017 American television series debuts
2017 American television series endings
Bravo (American TV network) original programming
English-language television shows